Alexandrovskaya is a municipal settlement in Pushkinsky District of the federal city of St. Petersburg, Russia. Population:

References

Municipal settlements under jurisdiction of Saint Petersburg
Pushkinsky District, Saint Petersburg